The Santo Domingo Open is a professional tennis tournament played on outdoor green clay courts in the Dominican Republic, originally known as Milex Open. From 2015, it is part of the ATP Challenger Tour. The tournament is currently held in the Santo Domingo Tennis Club (La Bocha) in Santo Domingo, Dominican Republic.

Past finals

Singles

Doubles

References

External links
 2015 Milex Open

 
Milex Open
Milex Open
2015 establishments in the Dominican Republic
Tennis tournaments in the Dominican Republic